Buellia sharpiana is a species of crustose lichen in the family Physciaceae. It was formally described as a new species in 2013 by lichenologists James Lendemer and Richard Harris. The specific epithet sharpiana honors Evelyn Bunches Sharp, wife of bryologist Aaron J. Sharp. The Sharps collected samples for the cryptogamic herbarium at the University of Tennessee at Knoxville, especially after the original collection was destroyed by a fire in 1998.

In 2020, the lichen was assessed as a vulnerable species by the IUCN.

See also
List of Buellia species

References

sharpiana
Lichen species
Lichens described in 2013
Lichens of the United States